Platform screen doors (PSDs), also known as platform edge doors (PEDs), are used at some train, rapid transit and people mover stations to separate the platform from train tracks, as well as on some bus rapid transit, tram and light rail systems. Primarily used for passenger safety, they are a relatively new addition to many metro systems around the world, some having been retrofitted to established systems. They are widely used in newer Asian and European metro systems, and Latin American bus rapid transit systems.

History 

The idea for platform edge doors dates as early as 1908, when Charles S. Shute of Boston was granted a patent for "Safety fence and gate for railway-platforms". The invention consisted of "a fence for railway platform edges", composed of a series of pickets bolted to the platform edge, and vertically movable pickets that could retract into a platform edge when there was a train in the station. In 1917, Carl Albert West was granted a patent for "Gate for subrailways and the like". The invention provided for spaced guides secured to a tunnel's side wall, with "a gate having its ends guided in the guides, the ends and intermediate portions of the gate having rollers engaging the side wall". Pneumatic cylinders with pistons would be used to raise the gates above the platform when a train was in the station. Unlike Shute's invention, the entire platform gate was movable, and was to retract upward.

The first stations in the world with platform screen doors were the ten stations of the Saint Petersburg Metro's Line 2 that opened between 1961 and 1972. The platform "doors" are actually openings in the station wall, which supports the ceiling of the platform. The track tunnels adjoining the ten stations' island platforms were built with tunnel boring machines (TBMs), and the island platforms were actually located in a separate vault between the two track tunnels. Usually, TBMs bore the deep-level tunnels between stations, while the station vaults are dug out manually and contain both the tracks and the platform. However, in the case of the Saint Petersburg Metro, the TBMs bored a pair of continuous tunnels that passed through ten stations, and the stations themselves were built in vaults that only contained the platform, with small openings on the sides of the vault, in order for passengers to access the trains in the tunnels.

Singapore's Mass Rapid Transit opened in 1987 is often described as the first heavy metro system in the world to incorporate PSDs into its stations for climate control and safety reasons, rather than due to architectural constraints, though the light Lille Metro opened in 1983 predates it.

Types 

Although the terms are often used interchangeably, platform screen doors can refer to both full-height and half-height barriers. Full height platform screen doors are total barriers between the station floor and ceiling, while the half-height platform screen doors are referred to as platform edge doors or automatic platform gates, as they do not reach the ceiling and thus do not create a total barrier. Platform gates are usually only half of the height of the full-screen doors, are chest-height sliding doors at the edge of railway platforms to prevent passengers from falling off the platform edge onto the railway tracks. But they sometimes reach to the height of the train. Like full-height platform screen doors, these platform gates slide open or close simultaneously with the train doors. These two types of platform screen doors are presently the main types in the world.

Platform screen doors and platform edge doors
These doors help to:

 Prevent people from accidentally falling onto the tracks, getting too close to moving trains, and committing suicide (by jumping) or homicide (by pushing).
 Prevent or reduce wind felt by the passengers caused by the piston effect which could in some circumstances make people lose their balance.
 Improve safety—reduce the risk of accidents, especially from trains passing through the station at high speeds.
 Improve climate control within the station (heating, ventilation, and air conditioning are more effective when the station is physically isolated from the tunnel).
 Improve security—access to the tracks and tunnels is restricted.
 Lower costs—eliminate the need for motormen or conductors when used in conjunction with automatic train operation, thereby reducing manpower costs.
 Prevent litter buildup on the tracks, which can be a fire risk, as well as damage and possibly obstruct trains.
 Improve the sound quality of platform announcements, as background noise from the tunnels and trains that are entering or exiting is reduced.
 At underground or indoor platforms, prevent the air from being polluted by the fumes caused by friction from the train wheels grinding against the tracks.

Their primary disadvantage is their cost; installing a system typically costs several million USD per station. When used to retrofit older systems, they limit the kind of rolling stock that may be used on a line, as train doors must have exactly the same spacing as the platform doors; this results in additional costs due to depot upgrades and otherwise unnecessary purchases of rolling stock.

Despite delivering an overwhelming improvement to passenger safety at the platform-train interface, platform screen doors do introduce new hazards which must be carefully managed in design and delivery. The principal hazard is entrapment between closed platform doors and the train carriage which, if undetected, can lead to fatality when the train begins to move (see ). Cases of this happening are rare, and the risk can be minimised with careful design, in particular by interlocking the door system with the signalling system, and by minimising the gap between the closed platform doors and the train body. In some cases active monitoring systems are used to monitor this gap.

Half-height platform edge doors, also known as automatic platform gates, are cheaper to install than full-height platform screen doors, which require more metallic framework for support. Some railway operators may therefore prefer such an option to improve safety at railway platforms and, at the same time, keep costs low and non-air-conditioned platforms naturally ventilated. However, these gates are less effective than full platform screen doors in preventing people from intentionally jumping onto the tracks. Most half-height platform edge door designs have taller designs than the ones installed on the Disneyland Resort line.

Rope-type screen doors 
There are also rope-type platform screen doors, where multiple train types with different length and train door structures use the same platforms. The barriers move upwards, rather than sideways, when letting passengers through.

Some Japanese, Korean, Chinese and eastern European countries have railway stations that use rope-type screen doors to lower the cost of installation and to deal with the problem of different train types and distance between the doors.

Use

Argentina
Line D of the Buenos Aires Subte is planned to have platform screen doors installed in the future as soon as the CBTC system is installed.

Australia 

Sydney Metro Northwest, the initial section of the Sydney Metro, which opened in May 2019, was the first-fully automated rapid transit rail system in Australia. Full-height screen doors are provided on most underground platforms, with half-height doors on at-grade, elevated and some underground platforms. The existing five stations on the Epping to Chatswood railway line were upgraded to rapid transit standard, all being fitted with half-height platform screen doors.

In Melbourne, the Metro Tunnel, from South Kensington to South Yarra, due to open in 2025, will have platform screen doors on the underground stations. New rolling stock  is being constructed, with doors that will line up with full-height ones on the platforms.

The Cross River Rail in Brisbane, which is currently under construction and scheduled to open in 2024, will have platform screen doors on the new Boggo Road, Woolloongabba and Albert Street underground stations, and the new underground platforms of Roma Street.

Austria 
Currently, only the Serfaus U-Bahn uses platform screen doors. Line U2 of the Vienna U-Bahn is being reconstructed from Schottentor station to Karlsplatz station, with the addition of platform screen doors to the reconstructed stations by 2023-2024.

Bangladesh 
The Dhaka Metro Rail uses half-height platform screen doors at all of its elevated stations.

Belarus 

Platform screen doors are being added to Line 3 of the Minsk Metro, which opened in late 2020.

Brazil 

The Platform Screen Doors are present in the São Paulo Metro since 2010, when the Sacomã Station was opened. As of 2019, 5 of the 6 lines of the São Paulo Metro have the equipment: Line 4 - Yellow and Line 15 - Silver have the equipment installed in all of its stations. The feature is also present in some stations of Line 2 - Green, Line 3 - Red and Line 5 - Lilac. They are planned to be installed in 41 stations of lines 1, 2 and 3 by the end of
2021, as well as all stations of line 5 by the end of 2020.

PSDs are also found on the tube stations of the RIT BRT and in the Santos Light Rail since 2016.

Bulgaria 

Half-height platform screen doors are in use on all stations of the Sofia Metro Line 3.

In 2020, rope-type screen door (RSD) system was installed in Vasil Levski Stadium Metro Station and Opalchenska Metro Station of the Sofia Metro Line 1 and Line 2. In total, such rope-type safety barriers will be installed on more 10 of the busiest stations on the Line 1 and 2 of the Sofia Metro, providing increased safety for passengers and protecting against accidental falls.

Canada 
Screen doors are in use at all three LINK Train stations and the Union and Pearson stations along the Union Pearson Express route to Toronto Pearson International Airport in Mississauga, Ontario. In addition, platform screen doors are expected to be used in the light metro Ontario Line.

Greater Montreal's forthcoming Réseau express métropolitain (REM), the 67-kilometre-long driverless complementary suburban rapid transit network opening in five phases between 2022 and 2024 will feature screen doors at each of its 26 stations.

With the advent of the REM on the horizon, calls to retrofit platform edge doors in the Montreal Metro to combat delays arising from overcrowding are becoming more common. If full-height doors were to be installed, it may reduce the difficulty in opening station entrance doors at ground level due to the pressure imbalance caused by passing trains. Given that there are two different train door layouts on the Montreal Metro, with the older MR-73 trains having 4 doors on each side of the car, and MPM-10 having 3, it is unlikely platform doors will be showing up in the Montreal Metro until the retirement of the MR-73 fleet.

Chile 

Platform edge doors are currently in use at Lines 3 and 6 of the Santiago Metro, being a novelty in the system.

China
All Chinese metro systems have platform screen doors installed on most of their lines. All stations built after the mid 2000s have some form of platform barrier. Only the Dalian Metro lines 3, 12, and 13, Wuhan Metro line 1 and Changchun Metro lines 3, 4, and 8 have stations without the platform screen doors on their early lines. However many are starting the process of retrofitting these lines with platform screen gates. In addition, many BRT systems such as the Guangzhou Bus Rapid Transit are also equipped with platform screen doors. Platform screen doors are also present in some tram and light rail stops such as the Xijiao Light rail, Nanjing tram and Chengdu tram, as well as some bus rapid transit stops. Several underground high speed railway stations of the CRH network use platform screen doors set back from the platform edge.

In addition, Fengxian District in Shanghai installed platform gates at a road crossing.

Colombia 
Several stations on Bogota's TransMilenio bus rapid transit system use platform screen doors.

Denmark

The Copenhagen Metro uses Westinghouse and Faiveley platform screen doors on all platforms. Full-height doors are used on underground stations while surface level stations have half-height doors (except from Lufthavnen and Orientkaj)

Finland
The Helsinki Metro had a trial run with Faiveley automatic platform gates installed on a single platform at Vuosaari metro station during phase one of the project. The doors, which are part of the Siemens metro automation project, were built in 2012. Phase 2 of the project has been delayed due to metro automation technical and safety related testings. The doors were removed in 2015.

France

All lines of the VAL automated subway system are equipped with platform screen doors at every station, starting with Lille subways in 1983. Those also include Toulouse and Rennes as well as the CDGVAL and Orlyval airport shuttles.

Paris Métro's line 14 from Saint-Lazare to Bibliothèque François Mitterrand was inaugurated in 1998 with platform screen doors manufactured by Faiveley Transport. The new station Olympiades opened with platform screen doors in June 2007. Line 1 has been retrofitted with platform edge doors, for full driverless automation effective in 2012. Some stations on Line 13 have had platform edge doors since 2010 to manage their overcrowding, after tests conducted in 2006, and stations on Line 4 are currently being fitted with platform edge doors in preparation for its automation.

Since 30 June 2020, a new kind of vertical platform screen doors, called platform curtains, are being tested on the platform 2bis of Vanves–Malakoff station (in Paris region) on the Transilien Line N commuter rail line. The experiment should end in February 2021. Transilien said that they preferred platform curtains to classical screen doors for this line because the positioning of the doors is not the same across the rolling stock, and that they plan to install them in other Transilien stations if the experiment is successful.

Germany
People movers at Frankfurt International Airport, Munich International Airport and Düsseldorf Airport are equipped with platform screen doors, as well as the suspended monorail in Dortmund, called H-Bahn. Plans are underway to test platform screen doors on the Munich U-Bahn in 2023 and line U5 & U6 will be installed in late 2026.

Greece 
Platform screen doors will be used on the driverless Thessaloniki Metro, which opens in November 2023 and in Line 4 of Athens Metro.

Hong Kong

Platform edge doors are currently only used in at-grade and elevated stations, while platform screen doors are used in all underground and some at-grade or elevated stations. None of the light rail platforms have platform screen doors or platform edge doors installed.

The MTR Corporation had since mid-1996, been studying the feasibility of installing PSDs at the older stations to reduce suicides on the MTR and reduce air-conditioning costs. Platform screen doors of two and a half cars' length were installed on each of the two platforms during the trial in 1996. As the Kwun Tong line trains consisted of 8 cars, it was decided that the PSDs were to be removed to allow for smoother train operations. 

The MTR decided in 1999 to undertake the PSD Retrofitting Programme at 74 platforms of 30 select underground stations on the Kwun Tong, Island, and s. 2,960 pairs of PSDs were ordered from Gilgen Door Systems. Choi Hung became the first station to receive platform screen doors from this programme in August 2001. The Mass Transit Railway became the first metro system in the world to retrofit PSDs on a transit system already in operation. The program was completed in March 2006. All subsequent new stations or platforms installed with PSDs also used those manufctured by Gilgen Door Systems.

In 2006, the MTR began studying ways to introduce barriers at above-ground and at-grade stations, which was considered more complicated as those stations were naturally ventilated and the introduction of full-height platform screen doors would entail the installation of air conditioning systems. In 2008, the corporation decided to install automatic platform gates (APGs) at  eight stations (the MTR Corporation Limited and KCR Corporation had been operationally merged since 2007, but KCR stations were not included in this study). The eight stations were retrofitted with APGs in 2011.

From July 2000 to December 2013, the MTR Corporation collected a surcharge of 10 cents from each Octopus-paying passenger to help pay for the installation of PSDs and APGs. Over HK$1.15 billion was collected in total.

Platform screen doors were also installed on all platforms of the West Rail line (now part of the Tuen Ma line), then built by the Kowloon-Canton Railway Corporation (KCRC) before the MTR–KCR merger. The Ma On Shan line did not have gates upon opening even though it was built at the same time as the West Rail; they were eventually added from 2014 to 2017 prior to the opening of the first phase of the Tuen Ma line on 14 February 2020.

The installation of platform screen doors in Hong Kong has been effective in reducing railway injuries and service disruptions.

The longest set of platform screen doors in the world can be found in East Tsim Sha Tsui station, where it first served the  when 12-car MLR trains were still in service.

The West Rail line (now part of Tuen Ma line), had all stations installed with APGs, and another constituent line of the Tuen Ma line, the Ma On Shan line, had its final APG installed enter service on 20 December 2017.

The last non-tram/light rail stations in Hong Kong without platform screen doors or gates are all on the East Rail line, a former KCR line not part of the MTR APG retrofitting programmes. However, these remaining thirteen stations are all being retrofitted by Kaba as part of the Sha Tin to Central Link project. Adding APGs to the East Rail Line platforms requires platform strengthening with rebars and brackets as the gates, combined with heavy winds, can greatly increase structural load on the platform structure. Also extensive waterproofing work is needed as many of these platforms are directly exposed to the elements.

As of May 15, 2022, three stations on the East Rail Line (Hung Hom, Exhibition Centre, Admiralty) are equipped with platform screen doors, with the remaining stations to have installed these doors in the future. The platform screen doors presently in service in the MTR have been supplied by the Swiss manufacturer Kaba Gilgen, the Japanese Nabtesco Corporation (under the Nabco brand), the French Faiveley Transport and Shenzhen Fangda Automatic System. 

Apart from the MTR, all stations on the Hong Kong International Airport Automated People Mover are equipped with platform screen doors made from Westinghouse Platform Screen Doors (for Phase 1) and Panasonic (for Midfield Extension).  The platforms for the shuttle bus service between the North Satellite Concourse and the East Hall of Terminal One at the HKIA, Chek Lap Kok, the New Territories and the bus platforms in Yue Man Square in Kwun Tong, New Kowloon are also retrofitted with PSDs. After it reopened on 27 August 2022, the Peak Tram was retrofitted with platform edge doors on the boarding side of the terminus stations.

India 
On the Delhi Metro, all stations on the Delhi Airport Metro Express line, which links to Indira Gandhi International Airport have been equipped with full-height platform screen doors since November 2015 and the six busiest stations on the Yellow Line have also been equipped with half height platform gates. Automatic platform gates on all the stations of the Pink, Magenta Line and Grey Line.

Platform screen doors are also used in all underground stations of the Chennai Metro.

There are platform screen doors in all elevated stations of Kolkata Metro Line 2. Platform screen doors will be introduced in underground stations of Kolkata Metro Line 2, Kolkata Metro Line 3, Kolkata Metro Line 6. There are plans to install platform screen doors also in Kolkata Metro Line 1.

All the stations of under-construction Hyderabad Airport Express Metro will have a provision of half-height platform screen doors (PSD) for improved passenger safety. On the Namma Metro in Bangalore, platform doors will be installed for its phase II operations and is expected to be completed by 2019.

On the Mumbai Metro, all lines being made by MMRDA will have half-height platform screen doors on all elevated stations and full-height platform screen doors in the underground stations, as the trains used in these lines have a GoA level 4, and also to reduce risk of passenger deaths by overcrowding. In Line 2A, The Yellow Line, Line 7A, The Red Line & Line 3, the Aqua line, will have full-height platform screen doors, as the line is fully underground, and like the MMRDA lines above, will have GoA level 4 (Unattended train operation).

All underground stations on the Pune Metro will have platform screen doors.

Indonesia 
The Soekarno–Hatta Airport Skytrain, opened in 2017, has full-height platform screen doors. The Jakarta MRT, opened in 2019, has full-height PSDs in underground stations and half-height PSDs in elevated stations. The Jakarta LRT, opened in 2019, has half-height PSDs. The Greater Jakarta LRT, which will open in 2022, will have half-height platform screen doors. PSDs are used in some TransJakarta bus stops, but they are often broken and have to be turned off.

Italy

Platform screen doors are used in most newly built rapid transit lines and systems of new construction in Italy. PSDs are present on Turin Metro, the Venice People Mover, the Perugia Minimetrò, the Brescia Metro, Line 5 of the Milan Metro, Marconi Express Bologna, Pisa Mover (linking Pisa airport and Pisa Centrale station) and Line C of the Rome Metro.

Japan

The Tokyo Metro and Toei Subway began using barriers with the 1991 opening of the Namboku Line (which has full-height platform screen doors), and subsequently installed automatic platform gates on the Mita, Marunouchi, and Fukutoshin lines. Some railway lines, including the subway systems in Sapporo, Sendai, Nagoya, Osaka, Kyoto, and Fukuoka, also utilize barriers to some extent.

In August 2012, the Japanese government announced plans to install barriers at stations used by 100,000 or more people per day, and the Ministry of Land, Infrastructure, Transport and Tourism allotted 36 million yen ($470,800) for research and development of the system the 2011-2012 fiscal year. A difficulty was the fact that some stations are used by different types of trains with different designs, making barrier design a challenge.

, only 34 of 235 stations with over 100,000 users per day were able to implement the plan. The ministry stated that 539 of approximately 9,500 train stations across Japan have barriers. Of the Tokyo Metro stations, 78 of 179 have some type of platform barrier.

Malaysia
The automated announcement message reading "For safety reasons, please stand behind the yellow line" in both English and Malay languages are also heard before the train arrived at all stations.

There are also platform screen doors (PSD) on the KLIA Ekspres at Kuala Lumpur Sentral and KLIA stations. Both stations at KLIA Aerotrain also have platform screen doors.

Mexico 

Platform screen doors are present at various bus rapid transit systems in Mexico, such as at the stations of the Guadalajara Macrobús and the Ecovía system of Monterrey. Platform screen doors can be seen as well on the Aerotrén, an airport people mover at Mexico City International Airport.

Philippines 
Half-height platform screen doors shall be installed on the North–South Commuter Railway, while full-height platform screen doors shall be installed on the Metro Manila Subway. The system is sought to open in stages between 2023 and 2025.

Peru 
Full-height platform screen doors will be used in underground stations of Line 2 of the Lima Metro, due to open in 2022.

Qatar 
Platform screen doors are in use in all stations of the Doha Metro. They are also found on the Lusail tram.

Russia 
Park Pobedy (Russian: Парк Победы) is a station of the Saint Petersburg Metro that was the first station in the world with platform doors. The station was opened in 1961. Later, nine more stations of this type were built in Leningrad (nowadays Saint Petersburg): Petrogradskaya (Russian: Петроградская), Vasileostrovskaya (Russian: Василеостровская), Gostiny Dvor (Russian: Гостиный двор), Mayakovskaya (Russian: Маяковская), Ploshchad Alexandra Nevskogo I (Russian: Площадь Александра Невского-1), Moskovskaya (Russian: Московская), Yelizarovskaya (Russian: Елизаровская), Lomonosovskaya (Russian: Ломоносовская), and Zvyozdnaya (Russian: Звёздная).

There was an electronic device to ensure that the train stopped with its doors adjacent to the platform doors; they were installed so that driverless trains could eventually be used on the lines. Line 2 uses GoA2 automatic train operation to make this easier, however, Line 3 does not. Unlike other platform screen doors, which are lightweight units with extensive glazing installed on a normal platform edge, the St Petersburg units give the appearance of a solid wall with heavyweight doorways and solid steel sliding doors, similar to a bank of elevators in a large building, and the train cannot be seen entering from the platform; passengers become familiar with the sound alone to indicate a train arrival.

In May 2018, two other similar stations were opened: Novokrestovskaya and Begovaya. Unlike the first ten stations that were built, these stations utilize glass screen doors, allowing the train to be seen from entering the platform, like most other systems. It is unclear why platform doors were installed here as they are absent in all other metros in Russia, the CIS (except that of Minsk, shown above), or the former Eastern bloc (excluding Sofia, also shown above, albeit on a line with equipment incompatible with that of the typical Eastern bloc metro).

The only other platform doors in Russia are found on the Sheremetyevo International Airport people mover.

Singapore
The Mass Rapid Transit (MRT) was the first rapid transit system in Asia to incorporate platform screen doors in its stations in 1987. Full height PSDs mainly manufactured by Westinghouse are installed at all underground MRT and sub-surface stations, while half-height platform screen doors were retrofitted into all elevated stations by March 2012. The LRT stations at Bukit Panjang, Sengkang and Punggol lack physical doors, only barriers with openings where the doors go (excluding the now-closed Ten Mile Junction station, which had full height doors) and vary in size according to their location on the platform.

There are two variants of the full-height platform screen doors in use. The first variant, made by Westinghouse, was installed at all underground stations along the North South line and the East West line from 1987 to the completion of the initial system in 1990. The second variant incorporating more glass on the doors has since been used on all lines thereafter.

Considered a novelty at the time of its installation, platform screen doors were introduced primarily to minimise hefty air-conditioning costs, especially since elevated stations are not air-conditioned and are much more economical to run in comparison. The safety aspects of these doors became more important in light of high-profile incidents where individuals were injured or killed by oncoming trains. In 2008, authorities began the process of retrofitting existing elevated stations with half-height screen doors. However, Land Transport Authority stated that the retrofit was not motivated by the need to make the stations safe, "but to prevent system-wide delay and service disruption and to reduce the social cost to all commuters caused by track intrusions." The retrofit was completed in 2012.

South Korea

Yongdu station of Seoul Subway Line 2 was the first station on the Seoul Subway to feature platform screen doors; the station opened in October 2005. By the end of 2009, many of the 289 stations operated by Seoul Metro had platform doors by Hyundai Elevator. Seoul Metro Lined 1, 2, 3, 4, 5, 6, 7, 8 and 9 were equipped with platform screen doors. However, not all stations operated by Korail have completed installation. All stations in South Korea will have platform screen doors by 2018. As of 2017, 100% of subway stations are equipped with platform screen doors in Daejeon, Gwangju, Busan, Incheon and Daegu.

The platform screen doors, installed in Munyang station in Daegu Metro Line 2 by The Korea Transport Institute in 2013, have a unique rope-based platform screen named Rope type Platform Safety Door (RPSD). A door sets of rope blocks separate the platform from the rails. When the train arrives, the rope screen door sets are vertically opened and allow passenger boarding to and from the train. This RPSD was also used in Nokdong station on Gwangju Metro Line 1, but was removed in 2012, and a new full-height platform screen door was installed in 2016 instead.

Spain
Half platform screens were installed first in Provença FGC station (Barcelona) around 2003. Later doors were tested on Barcelona Metro line 11 before fitting them on all stations for the new lines 9 and 10, which operate driverless. Platform screen doors were also trialed on four stations of line 12 (MetroSur) of the Madrid Metro from November 2009 until January 2010. Platform doors are also found on the Madrid Barajas Airport People Mover at Adolfo Suárez Madrid–Barajas Airport.

Sweden 
Stockholm commuter rail has platform doors on two underground stations opened in July 2017, as part of the Stockholm City Line. The Stockholm Metro will test platform doors at Åkeshov metro station in 2015 & Bagarmossen metro station in 2021, the metro stations including Kungsträdgården metro station-Nacka Kungsträdgården metro station-Hagsätra metro station will have platform screen doors when it is completed between 2026-2030. As there are multiple door layouts in use on the Stockholm Metro (a full length C20 having 21 doors on each side, and the older Cx series and newer C30 having 24), it is unlikely platform doors will be common anytime soon. The underground Liseberg station in Gothenburg has platform doors which were built before its opening 1993. The reason was safety against the freight trains that go in this tunnel. These doors are built one meter from the platform edge and do not restrict the train type.

Switzerland 
Zurich International Airport's Skymetro shuttle between the main building (hosting terminals A and B) and the detached terminal E has glass screen doors separating the tracks from the passenger hall platforms at both ends.

Lausanne Metro's Line M2 has glass screen doors at every station.

Taiwan

On Taipei Metro, platform screen doors were first installed on the Wenhu line (then known as Muzha line) in 1996. Older high-capacity MRT lines (Tamsui-Xinyi Line, Songshan-Xindian Line, Zhonghe-Xinlu line, and the Bannan Line) were initially constructed without platform screen doors but have been retrofitted with automatic platform gates since 2018. Newer stations, on the Xinyi Line (part of the Tamsui-Xinyi Line), Luzhou and Xinzhuang Line (part of the Zhonghe-Xinlu Line), Songshan Line (part of the Songshan-Xindian Line), Circular line, and part of the Bannan Line's Dingpu Station and Taipei Nangang Exhibition Center Station) are constructed with platform screen doors. The Circular Line have installed platform screen doors since opening, but Danhai Light Rail did not.

On Kaohsiung Metro, all underground stations have installed platform screen doors, while elevated stations did not. Daliao Station installed half-height platform screen doors in 2020.

On Taoyuan Metro and Taichung Metro, all elevated stations installed half-height platform screen doors while underground stations installed full-height platform screen doors.

Thailand 

Platform screen doors were first installed on the BTS Skytrain and Bangkok MRT System since it first operates. Followed by the Airport Rail Link System in Makkasan Station (Express Platform) and Suvarnabhumi Station (both City and Express Line Platform. BTS Skytrain system first installed the platform screen doors at Siam Station. Followed by all the busy stations during rush hours. Today, almost all stations on the Bangkok Electrified Rail System have installed platform screen doors preventing people from falling onto the tracks. BTS Skytrain system has installed PSDs on 18 stations out of its 44 stations. Both Purple and Blue Line of Bangkok MRT system has installed PSDs on all of its stations. Airport Rail link has installed a stainless steel fence to prevent from falling but has not installed an automated door due to a speed of the train is too fast that it will break the glass. All new stations in Bangkok must install platform screen doors as a rule.

Turkey 
Platform doors are found on Istanbul Metro lines M5, M7, M8 and M11, all fully driverless. Seyrantepe station on line M2 and F1, F3 and F4 also have platform doors.

United Arab Emirates 

Platform screen doors are installed on all the platforms in the fully automated Dubai Metro, as well as on the Dubai Airport People Mover, Palm Jumeirah Monorail and Dubai Tram (the world's first tram system to feature platform screen doors).

United Kingdom

The Jubilee Line Extension project saw platform edge doors installed on its new stations that were underground, and were produced by Westinghouse. There are plans to install PEDs in existing London Underground stations along the Bakerloo, Central, Piccadilly, and Waterloo & City lines as part of New Tube for London. A provision for installing platform edge doors is found on the Northern line extension stations, but no doors were installed in the stations when they opened in 2021, this is because 1995 stock cannot control platform screen doors in-cab, unlike 1996 stock used on Jubilee Line.

PEDs are present on the Gatwick Airport shuttle system, Heathrow Airport Terminal 5 airside people-mover shuttle, Birmingham Airport AirRail Link and Stansted Airport Transit System.

The Elizabeth line, the new cross-city line for London (delivered as the Crossrail Project) has platform screen doors on each of the sixteen sub-surface platforms of its central section. Each platform has twenty-seven doors which align with the twenty-seven saloon doors of the new British Rail Class 345 which operates the service. The doors form a 2.5m high glass and steel screen the entire length of the platform. The door opening is 2.1m wide, and the system includes integrated passenger information and digital advertising screens. The system is unusual in that the trains served are full-sized commuter trains, larger and longer than the trains of metro systems more commonly equipped with platform screen doors. In total, some 4km of platform screen is provided.

The Glasgow Subway will have half-height screen doors after new rolling stock are introduced in 2023.

United States 

Platform screen doors are rare in the United States, and with one exception, are exclusively found on small-scale systems. The Las Vegas Monorail system is currently the only general-purpose rapid transit system in the US to use platform screen doors. Honolulu Rail Transit will become the first large-scale publicly run metro system in the United States to feature platform screen doors, when it opens in 2023. All 21 stations will feature platform gates manufactured by Stanley Access Technologies.

New York City's Metropolitan Transportation Authority has not committed to installing platform screen doors in its subway system, though it had been considering such an idea since the 1980s. Their installation presents substantial technical challenges, in part because of different placements of doors on New York City Subway rolling stock. Additionally, the majority of the system cannot accommodate platform doors regardless of door locations, due to factors such as narrow platforms and structurally insufficient platform slabs (see ). Following a series of incidents during one week in November 2016, in which three people were injured or killed after being pushed into tracks, the MTA started to consider installing platform edge doors for the 42nd Street Shuttle.
Following several pushing incidents, the MTA announced a PSD pilot program at three stations in February 2022: the  platform at Times Square; the  platform at Sutphin Boulevard–Archer Avenue–JFK Airport; and the Third Avenue station. However, this initiative has been over one year and still no progress.

People movers, systems that ferry passengers across large distances they would otherwise walk, make use of platform screen doors. These systems are common at airports such as Hartsfield–Jackson Atlanta International Airport and Denver International Airport. The Port Authority of New York and New Jersey uses full height platform screen doors at two of its systems: AirTrain JFK and AirTrain Newark (serving John F. Kennedy International Airport and Newark Liberty International Airport respectively). San Francisco International Airport has AirTrain, a 6-mile-long line whose stations are fully enclosed with platform screen doors, allowing access to the fully automated people mover. Chicago O'Hare International Airport has a people mover system which operates 24 hours a day and is a 2.5 mile long (4 km) line that operates between the four terminals at the airport and parking areas; each station is fully enclosed with platform screen doors allowing access to the fully automated people mover trains. AeroTrain is a  people mover system at Washington Dulles International Airport in Dulles, Virginia with fully enclosed tracks including platform screen doors. The United States Capitol subway system, a train cart people mover system, uses platform gates.

Venezuela 
Platform screen doors are in use on the Los Teques Metro. The first station to have screen doors implemented on the system was Guaicaipuro.

Incidents 
On the Shanghai Metro in 2007, a man forcing his way onto a crowded train became trapped between the train door and platform door as they closed. He was pulled under the departing train and killed. In 2010, a woman in Shanghai's Zhongshan Park Station was killed under the same circumstances when she got trapped between the train and platform doors. An almost identical death occurred on the Beijing Subway in 2014 the third death involving platform doors in China within the several years preceding it. In 2018, a woman was similarly trapped between the platform doors and train at Shanghai's Bao'an Highway station. She escaped injury by standing still as the train departed. On January 22, 2022, an elderly woman was killed when she got trapped between the train doors and platform screen doors at Shanghai's Qi'an Road Station.

Between 1999 and 2012, London Underground's platform doors, all on the Jubilee line, were the cause of 75 injuries including strikes to peoples' heads and arms.

References

External links 
 

Air pollution control systems
Building biology
Building engineering
Construction
Door automation
Heating, ventilation, and air conditioning
Mechanical engineering
Noise control
Protective barriers
Railway platforms
Railway safety
Rapid transit
Security engineering
Security technology
Soviet inventions
Suicide prevention
Train protection systems
Vehicle safety technologies